"" (Italian, "Song of the Verbena"), officially "" ("And while Siena sleeps") and also known simply as "la Verbena", is a traditional song from the city of Siena, Italy. Its common title and lyrics refer to the verbena plant, which, according to local folklore, grew within the Piazza del Campo thanks to the presence of the Bottini di Siena, a series of underground tunnels used to provision the city with water in the mediaeval period. Today, "la Verbena" has become a hymn to the city of Siena, and is popularly sung at sporting events like those of the Palio di Siena and of the local Robur Siena football club.

On 12–13 March 2020, a viral tweet circulated that showed a video of residents, who were under generalised quarantine due to the COVID-19 pandemic, singing "la Verbena" together from their windows. This was one of many reports of community music-making that surfaced in Italy during the quarantine.

Lyrics 

The first verse of the traditional lyrics is little-known, sung neither during the palio di Siena nor on other occasions. The second verse is most well-known and frequently sung outside of the context of the palio.

During the palio, the above version is never sung by the residents of the participating contrades; rather, these lyrics remain as a contrade-neutral version of the song. Lyrical variations set to the same melody very commonly come into existence. Often goliardic, these may be battle hymns for one's own contrade or a taunt for an opposing one. Ad hoc versions are also frequently heard, such as those referring to a particular event like a victory or a rival contrade's defeat, or even hymns dedicated to a particular jockey or horse.

A common palio-specific hymn is sung as follows:

When a contrade is victorious, the last line may instead be sung: "" ("for strength and for love / you have been purged"), a derisive taunt towards a rival contrade that has just been defeated ("purged").

References 

Tuscany
Siena
Italian songs
Italian folk songs